The Ultra Rich: How Much Is Too Much?  is a 1989 polemic nonfiction book by Vance Packard. It details the lives of extravagance of thirty American super-rich (among them: J. R. Simplot, Bob Guccione, Ed Bass, Jane Hunt, and Samuel J. LeFrak). He argues against the vast accumulation of wealth, and advocates for a wealth tax and inheritance tax reform.

References

1989 non-fiction books